Martin Sherard "Marty, Simpson (born January 10, 1972) is an American comedian, actor, performer, and motivational speaker from Columbia, South Carolina (U.S.A.) Marty was featured in World Magazine in the summer of 2011. (Vol. 26, No. 15). He is a notable performer in the genre of Christian Comedy.

Early life

High school 

While playing football in high school, Marty set 3 different State Records. All in the field goal kicking category.  The first, in 1988, was a record tying 57 yard field goal (distance record). In 1989, Marty converted 55 P.A.T.'s (Points After Touchdowns) in a row. Then, in October 1989,  he broke his formerly tied record of 57 yards with a 61-yard field goal versus Hilcrest of Dazel.

The Spring Valley Vikings (Columbia, SC) won the AAAA State Championship 3 to 0 versus Gaffney (Gaffney, SC) on a 27-yard field goal, by Simpson (on first down), in overtime on the last play of the game.  Before Marty's senior season, he was named a pre-season Street and Smith's first team All-American place-kicker. Marty became the first South Carolinian to be named USA Today first team All-USA at the end of his senior season. The second All-USA selection from South Carolina was Derwin Jeffcoat (1990), a teammate of Simpson's at the University of South Carolina. Marty was also named to Parade Magazine's first team selections at the end of the season.

College 

After reviewing more than 40 full scholarship offers from Division 1 schools, Marty decided to stay home and play football for the University of South Carolina for then rookie head coach Sparky Woods. In 1992, Marty became the first Gamecock to ever score points in the Southeastern Conference. Simpson's 26 yard field goal versus Georgia in the first quarter of the inaugural S.E.C. game gave the Gamecocks the lead 3 to 0. The Gamecocks would go on to lose that ball game 28 to 6. This little known fact was errantly reported in a book chronicling the 100-year history of South Carolina football. The error was simply a mistake on the author's part, crediting the first points in the S.E.C. to a player named a name that never even played for South Carolina.

Mainstream 

Before being a stand-up comedian, Marty coached at Ben Lippen School in Columbia, South Carolina, where he served as N.F.L. veteran, Samkon Gado's head coach.

Marty was featured in a World Magazine article (Vol. 26, No. 15) in the summer of 2011.

Marty's comedy career break came in February 2009 when Black Entertainment Television hosted an open call audition for a new television series called "A Time to Laugh." Marty was the only Caucasian Comedian chosen for the show. The show taped in March 2009 and was originally slated to air sometime in late spring or early summer of 2009, but new information suggests that the show will be a part of B.E.T.'s January 2010 new line-up. Marty was featured as one of 30 stand-up comedians to perform and was also in 6 comedy sketches which will air as parts of other episodes.

Marty also was a popular blogger/author for the Rivals.com affiliate site www.GamecockCentral.com. His articles were a mix of satire football observations as well as hard-core chalk-talk style break-down articles. An example of one of those articles can be found at www.GamecockCentral.com.

Marty's DVD "Clean if it Kills Me" drew critical acclaim upon its release in the late spring of 2014 from Christian Media outlets like www.ChristianPost.com  and other various Christian television shows.

References

External links

1972 births
21st-century American comedians
Living people
American Christians